Ro 04-6790 is a drug, developed by Hoffmann–La Roche, which has applications in scientific research. It acts as a potent and selective receptor antagonist for the 5-HT6 serotonin receptor subtype, with little or no affinity at other receptors. In common with other drugs of this class, Ro 04-6790 has nootropic effects in animals, and reduces the amnesia produced by memory-impairing drugs such as dizocilpine and scopolamine.

References 

Nootropics
Aminopyrimidines
5-HT6 antagonists
Hoffmann-La Roche brands